Marc Thomé (born 4 November 1963) is a Luxembourgian football manager and former player who played as a midfielder.

References

1963 births
Living people
Luxembourgian footballers
Association football midfielders
Luxembourg international footballers
FA Red Boys Differdange players
Jeunesse Esch players
CS Grevenmacher players
F91 Dudelange players
Luxembourgian football managers
US Rumelange managers
CS Grevenmacher managers
FC Differdange 03 managers
Jeunesse Esch managers